The Gospel According to the Blues is a Canadian television drama film, directed by Thom Fitzgerald and released in 2010. Adapted from George Boyd's stage play Gideon's Blues, the film stars Jackie Richardson as Momma-Lou Steele, a woman advocating for change in her community after her son Gideon (Richard Chevolleau), a college graduate struggling to find stable employment, becomes drawn into the local illegal drug trade.

The film also stars Karen Robinson as Gideon's wife Cherlene, as well as Cory Bowles, Lucy DeCoutere and John Dunsworth in supporting roles.

The film premiered June 1, 2010 on Vision TV.

Awards
Richardson won the Gemini Award for Best Performance by an Actress in a Leading Role in a Dramatic Program or Mini-Series at the 26th Gemini Awards, and Robinson was nominated for Best Performance by an Actress in a Featured Supporting Role in a Dramatic Program or Mini-Series.

References

External links

Canadian drama television films
2010 television films
2010 films
Black Canadian films
English-language Canadian films
Films directed by Thom Fitzgerald
Films based on Canadian plays
VisionTV original programming
2010s Canadian films